is the oldest and largest of private Japanese women's universities.  The university was established on 20 April 1901 by education reformist .

The university has around 6000 students and 200 faculty.  It has two campuses, named after the neighborhoods in which they are located: Mejirodai (目白台) in Bunkyō, Tokyo, and Nishi-Ikuta (西生田) in Tama, Kawasaki, Kanagawa Prefecture.

There are associated schools from kindergarten through senior high school.

History 
Japan Women's University was founded by educator Jinzo Naruse in 1901. Initially, the university comprised three departments: home economics, Japanese literature, and English literature.

Faculty 
home economics
humanities
Integrated arts and social sciences
sciences

Notable alumnae
Tsuruko Haraguchi, first Japanese woman to earn a doctorate in psychology
Yumie Hiraiwa, novelist
Raicho Hiratsuka
Tano Jōdai, sixth president of Japan Women's University
Hideko Inouye, first woman president of Japan Women's University
Shina Inoue Kan
Tsuruyo Kondo, politician
Tomi Kora, politician
Keiko Matsui
Ayame Mizushima, screenwriter
Yuriko Miyamoto
Kazuyo Sejima, architect
Rumiko Takahashi, manga artist
Toshiko Tamura

Access
The closest train stations to the Mejiro Campus are:
 Tokyo Metro Fukutoshin Line: About 8 minutes by foot from Zoshigaya Station (exit 3)
 Tokyo Metro Yurakucho Line: About 10 minutes by foot from Gokokuji Station (exit 4)

References

External links

 English Homepage 

 
1948 establishments in Japan
Educational institutions established in 1948
Private universities and colleges in Japan
Universities and colleges in Kanagawa Prefecture
Women's universities and colleges in Japan
Universities and colleges in Tokyo